Jamiatul Ilm Wal Huda, also known as Darul Uloom Blackburn, is an 11–25 private, Islamic, boarding and day school for boys in Blackburn, Lancashire, England. It was established in 1997 and its name means The College of Knowledge and Guidance.

The majority of pupils that attend the school are local, but some come from around the UK, and a small minority are international students. The school therefore offers boarding facilities for about a third of its pupils.

Purpose 
The purpose of this institute is to allow individuals within the Islamic community to learn more about their religion, Islam. It also allows to propagate the religion to others. Within some Islamic sects, it is also regarded as a compulsory act which can be fulfilled for the entire community if an individual within the community is sent to gain this knowledge. Henceforth, the obligatory act will be regarded as fulfilled for the entire community.

See also
Darul Uloom Bolton
Darul Uloom Bury
Darul Uloom Al-Madania
Darul Uloom London
Darul Uloom Zakariyya
Madinatul Uloom Al Islamiya
Mazahirul Uloom Saharanpur

References

External links 
 

Schools in Blackburn
Private schools in Blackburn with Darwen
Boarding schools in Lancashire
Boys' schools in Lancashire
Islamic schools in England
Educational institutions established in 1997
1997 establishments in England